Rivieren Castle (French: Chateau Rivieren, Dutch: Kasteel ter Rivieren) is a twelfth-century castle in Ganshoren, Brussels, Belgium. Rivieren Castle is situated at an elevation of 40 meters.

Originally a defence tower, the present-day castle was built in different phases from the twelfth to the nineteenth century.
Originally a possession of the Clutinck (Clutinc/Clutinckx) family, the castle later changed ownership several times until it finally was sold in 1973. Today, the castle is used for conferences, receptions, expositions and similar kinds of events.

The Castle ter Rivieren is located in a park of 10 hectares.

References

External links
 Chateau Rivieren (in French)
 Kasteel ter Rivieren, at routeyou.com (in Dutch)

Castles in Belgium
Castles in Brussels
Ganshoren